Kwak Yoon-Gy (Hangul: 곽윤기, Hanja:  郭潤起;  or ; born 26 December 1989) is a South Korean short track speed skater. He is the 2012 Overall World Champion. He is also the two-time Olympics silver medalist in the 2010 and 2022 Winter Olympic Games.

Philanthropy
On 9 March 2022, Kwak donated  million to the Hope Bridge Disaster Relief Association to help the victims of the massive wildfires that started in Uljin, Gyeongbuk. and also spread to Samcheok, Gangwon.

Filmography

Television shows

See also 
 List of 2010 Winter Olympics medal winners
 List of 2022 Winter Olympics medal winners

References

External links

Kwak Yoon-Gy's biography on nbcolympics.com

1989 births
Living people
South Korean male short track speed skaters
Olympic short track speed skaters of South Korea
Olympic silver medalists for South Korea
Olympic medalists in short track speed skating
Short track speed skaters at the 2010 Winter Olympics
Short track speed skaters at the 2018 Winter Olympics
Short track speed skaters at the 2022 Winter Olympics
Medalists at the 2010 Winter Olympics
Medalists at the 2022 Winter Olympics
Speed skaters from Seoul
World Short Track Speed Skating Championships medalists
21st-century South Korean people